Cox Creek may refer to:

United States
 Cox Creek Township, Clayton County, Iowa
 Cox Creek (Alabama), United States, a stream
 Cox Creek (Missouri), United States, a stream

See also
 Coxs Creek, Kentucky, United States, an unincorporated community and a nearby creek
 Coxs Creek (Belfield, New South Wales), Australia, a watercourse